The Women's 4 × 100 metre medley relay competition of the 2020 European Aquatics Championships was held on 23 May 2021.

Records
Before the competition, the existing world, European and championship records were as follows.

The following new records were set during this competition.

Results

Heats
The heats were started at 11:08.

Final
The final was held at 19:21.

References

Women's 4 x 100 metre medley relay